Earth to America is the ninth studio album by the Athens, Georgia-based band Widespread Panic. It was recorded in January 2006 with Terry Manning producing in Nassau, Bahamas at the Compass Point Studios. The album is being offered in three variations; a regular CD release, a digipak release, and a vinyl record release. The digipak release includes free song downloads through the band's concert album web page, Live Widespread Panic.com. The vinyl release includes two extra bonus tracks not found on the regular CD release.

Track listing
"Second Skin" (Widespread Panic, Joseph) – 11:18
"Goodpeople" (Widespread Panic) – 6:04
"From the Cradle" (Widespread Panic, Tonks) – 4:22
"Solid Rock" (Dylan) – 5:02
"Time Zones" (Widespread Panic, Joseph) – 5:15
"When the Clowns Come Home" (Widespread Panic) – 4:26
"Ribs and Whiskey" (Widespread Panic) – 4:53
"Crazy" (Widespread Panic) – 4:19
"You Should Be Glad" (Widespread Panic) – 10:11
"May Your Glass Be Filled" (Widespread Panic) – 6:08

Personnel
Widespread Panic
John Bell - guitar, vocals
George McConnell - guitar, vocals
Todd Nance - percussion, drums, vocals
Domingo S. Ortiz - percussion
Dave Schools - bass, percussion, vocals
John Hermann - keyboards

Guest performers
Jawara Adams - The Compass Point Horns
Tino Richardson - The Compass Point Horns
The Phuket Chamber Orchestra
Chris Melchior - conductor and first chair violin

Personnel
Terry Manning - Producer, Engineer, Mastering
Billy Field - recording assistant
Osie Bowe - assistant engineer
Alex Dixon - assistant engineer
Chris Bilheimer - art and package design

Charts

References

External links
Widespread Panic website
Everyday Companion
[ Allmusic link]

2006 albums
Widespread Panic albums
Albums produced by Terry Manning